She's in London is a British LGB web series set in London, England. The series is composed of six ten-minute episodes and revolves around the closure of a fictional lesbian Soho bar and a love triangle between a bar tender, her best friend and her best friend's ex. It stars Miri, Clare Hopes, and Joanna Ludlow and is distributed via the US-based subscription site TelloFilms. She's in London marks the first non-US series for TelloFilms.

Funding for the series was partially raised through a successful Kickstarter campaign. The soundtrack includes tracks from a number of LBQ artists and bands including Lucy Spraggan, MIRI, ME and Deboe, Greymatter, Playing House and DJ Sarah Cooper. The series bills itself as the first LBQ web series to come out of the United Kingdom.

Synopsis
Theo (Miri) tends bar in a lesbian bar in Soho. While the bar is iconic a mainstream property developer wants to close the venue, forcing its owner Jill (Kerry Leigh) to launch a campaign to keep it alive. Complicating matters is Theo's relationship with her best friend Sam (Joanna Ludlow), as Theo has slept with her beautiful ex Mel (Clare Hopes).

Cast
Miri as Theo
Clare Hopes as Mel
Joanna Ludlow as Sam
Kerry Leigh as Jill
Lauren Karl as Hana
Natasha Rebuck as Alex
Rachael Cooksey as Jo
Jake Graf as John
Adwoa-Alexsis Mintah as Adi
Sarah Lavender as Ella

Episodes
Episode 1 - 27 September 2015
Episode 2 - 4 October 2015
Episode 3 - 11 October 2015
Episode 4 - 18 October 2015
Episode 5 - 25 October 2015
Episode 6 - 1 November 2015

Reception
Diva rated the series highly and wrote that it was "a love letter from the queer community of Soho to itself and that's what makes it worth the watching."

References

External links
 
 
 She's in London at Tellofilms.com
 Interview at The Human Experience

2015 web series debuts
British drama web series
Crowdfunded web series
Lesbian-related television shows
British LGBT-related web series